Peddle is a surname. Notable people with the surname include:

 Ambrose Peddle (1927–2014), Canadian politician
 Chuck Peddle (1937–2019), American computer hardware engineer
 John B. Peddle (1868-1933), American Professor of Machine Design and author
 Julian Peddle (born 1955), English entrepreneur
 Juliet Peddle (1899–1979), American architect
 Geoff Peddle (born 1963), Anglican bishop
 Mark Peddle ( 21st century), Canadian musician